Laohwangping Airfield (Chinese: 旧州机场) is a former World War II United States Army Air Forces airfield,  located approximately 1 mile west of Jiuzhou Zhen (旧州镇), Huangping County, Guizhou Province, then in the Republic of China.

Role in WWII
It was designed to be a refuelling station for aircraft coming from Chihkiang Airfield, Hunan,. Eventually it became  the primary home of the 35th Photographic Reconnaissance Squadron, which flew unarmed P-38 Lightning photo-reconnaissance aircraft from the airfield beginning in February 1945 until the end of the war. It was also the home of the 23d Fighter Group 76th Fighter Squadron, equipped with P-51 Mustangs in February 1945.

Construction
The airfield was slowly built from 1939. Serious construction only began from October 1943 as the Wu Dingchang (吴鼎昌), Governor of Guizhou, came to rally. It is officially opened from early 1945, yet it was partially operational and began in use from late 1943. It has a compressed earth runway with tents and small wooden buildings used for a support facility.

It appears to have been closed and dismantled in September 1945 after the war ended, with the land being returned to agricultural use.  The available satellite image of this area of China is very low resolution and it is difficult to determine if any relics of the airfield exist.

References

 Maurer, Maurer. Air Force Combat Units Of World War II. Maxwell Air Force Base, Alabama: Office of Air Force History, 1983. 
 Airfields & Seaplane Anchorages China
 USAFHRA Document search - Laohwangping

External links

Airfields of the United States Army Air Forces in China